J. Michael Fay (born September 1956, Plainfield, New Jersey) is an American ecologist and conservationist notable for, among other things, the MegaTransect, in which he spent 455 days walking 2,000 miles (3,200 km) across Africa and the MegaFlyover in which he and pilot Peter Ragg spent months flying 70,000 miles in a small plane at low altitude, taking photographs every twenty seconds. Both projects were sponsored by the National Geographic Society, which produced articles and documentaries about the projects.

Biography
Fay graduated in 1978 from the University of Arizona, and then joined the Peace Corps working in Tunisia and the Central African Republic. In 1984 he joined the Missouri Botanical Garden. He completed his doctorate on the western lowland gorilla in 1997, while also surveying large forest blocks by aeroplane and working to create and manage the Dzanga-Sangha park and the Nouabalé-Ndoki National Park in the Central African Republic and Republic of the Congo. 

He has worked for the Wildlife Conservation Society since 1990, and was an Explorer in Residence at the National Geographic Society. 

In 2006, Fay and National Geographic photographer Michael Nichols traveled to Zakouma National Park to document the danger poachers create for the world's largest remaining concentration of elephants. Their trip resulted in Ivory Wars, Last Stand in Zakouma.

He has testified before the United States Congress on the need for preservation of wildlife and habitat.

He was once attacked by an elephant and currently lives in Alaska on an island with no indoor plumbing.

As of 2022, he is working on conservation projects in Gabon with the Agence Nationale Des Parcs Nationaux.

See also
 2006 Zakouma elephant slaughter
 MegaFlyover
 MegaTransect

References

External links
Unuk River Post
 US Department of State biography
 National Geographic
 National Public Radio transcript on MegaFlyover
 National Geographic Photo Gallery: Megatransect
 Ivory Wars, produced by Mediastorm
 A survey of the proposed Nouabale conservation area in northern Congo, J. Michael Fay, et al. , Wildlife Conservation International, September 1990
 Article by David Quammen

American ecologists
American environmentalists
Peace Corps volunteers
People from Plainfield, New Jersey
University of Arizona alumni
1956 births
Living people
Missouri Botanical Garden people
American expatriates in Tunisia
American expatriates in the Central African Republic